Saarvajanika Naga Brahmastana (Kannada/Tulu:ಸಾರ್ವಜನಿಕ ನಾಗ ಬ್ರಹ್ಮಸ್ಥಾನ) is an ancient Hindu temple, situated at  Moodanidambooru (Bannanje) village of Udupi district in Karnataka.

It is one of the oldest Nagabana in Udupi for snake worship. Here Nagaraja, Nagayakshi & Nagakannika are worshipped together with Brahma, Raktheshwari, Nandikona, Kshetrapala and Bobbarya daiva.

Puja activities 
Ashlesha Bali Pooja, Sarpa Samskara, Durga Namaskara, Ranga Pooja & Deeparadhana Pooja are done at Naga Brahmastana.

Special rituals are performed during Nagara Panchami, Subrahmanya Shasti, Navarathri and on the day of Varshikotsava.

Daily Pooja is performed in the morning at 10.00am and special pooja is performed every Saturday.

Gallery

See also 
 Vasuki
 Nāga
 Snake worship
 Nagaradhane
 Tulu Nadu

References 
 http://vijaykarnataka.indiatimes.com/articleshow/33620104.cms
 http://epaper.udayavani.com/PDF/MANIPAL/2012-04-08/man08041202eup.pdf

External links and videos 

Hindu temples in Udupi district